Jennifer L. "Jenny" Keim (born June 17, 1978) is an American diver. She competed at the 2000 Summer Olympics in Sydney, in the women's 3 metre springboard. She was born in Miami, Florida.

References

External links

1978 births
Living people
American female divers
Olympic divers of the United States
Divers at the 1996 Summer Olympics
Divers at the 2000 Summer Olympics
21st-century American women